Melvyn Ford (birth registered first ¼ 1924) is a Welsh professional rugby league footballer who played in the 1950s.

Early life
Mel Ford's birth was registered in Bedwellty district, Wales, in the first ¼ 1924.

International honours
Mel Ford won a cap for Wales while at Aberavon 1951 1-cap.

References

1920s births
Year of birth missing
Possibly living people
Aberavon RLFC players
Rugby league players from Bedwellty
Rugby league props
Wales national rugby league team players
Welsh rugby league players